The 2015 Puskás Cup was the eighth edition of the Puskás Cup and took place between 3 April to 6 April in Felcsút, Hungary. La Fábrica were the defending champions. One new team, Feyenoord Academy, were invited by the organisers for this event.

On 26 March 2015, the draw took place in Felcsút, Hungary. At the drawing, former Feyenoord and Bayern Munich star Roy Makaay was also present.

The 2015 Puskás Cup was won by Budapest Honvéd by beating three-time champions La Fábrica in the final on 6 April 2015 at the Pancho Arena in Felcsút. Hagi Academy finished third by beating Feyenoord Academy. The home side, Puskás Akadémia finished fifth by beating Panathinaikos 2-1.

Participating teams
 Budapest Honvéd (former club of Ferenc Puskás)
 La Fábrica (former club of Ferenc Puskás)
 Feyenoord Academy (invited)
 Hagi Academy (invited)
 Panathinaikos (former club of Ferenc Puskás)
 Puskás Akadémia (host)

Venues

Squads

Budapest Honvéd
Coach: Tibor Farkas

La Fábrica
Coach: Tristán David Celador

Feyenoord Academy
Coach: Cor Adriaanse

Hagi Academy
Coach: Nicolae Rosca

Panathinaikos
Coach: Henk Herder

Puskás Akadémia
Coach: Károly Varga

Results
All times are local (UTC+2).

Group A

Group B

Fifth place play-off

Third place play-off

Final

Statistics

Goalscorers
4 goals 
  Gómez Alcón (La Fábrica)

2 goals 
  Florinel Coman (Hagi Academy)
  Bence Zsigmond (Puskás Akadémia)
  Bálint Tömösvári (Budapest Honvéd)
  Roland Vajda (Budapest Honvéd)

1 goal 
  Dániel Váczi (Budapest Honvéd)
  Álvaro Martín Alcántara (La Fábrica)
  Llario Mascardó (La Fábrica)
  Nebai Hernández Cruz (La Fábrica)
  Oscar Rodriguez Arnaiz (La Fábrica)
  Robertha Nigel (Feyenoord Academy)
  Tarik Fagrach (Feyenoord Academy)
  Dylan Vente (Feyenoord Academy)
  Casap Carlo (Hagi Academy)
  Andrei Ciobanu (Hagi Academy)
  Andre Vladescu (Hagi Academy)
  Konstantinos Valmas (Panathinaikos)
  Panteleimon Pispas Sotirios (Panathinaikos)
  Gábor Végh (Puskás Akadémia)
  Szilárd Magyari (Puskás Akadémia)

References

External links
Official website

2010
2014–15 in Spanish football
2014–15 in Hungarian football
2014–15 in Greek football
2014–15 in Romanian football
2014–15 in Dutch football